Antonio Zelić (born 5 June 1994) is a Croatian bobsledder. He competed in the 2018 Winter Olympics.

References

1994 births
Living people
Bobsledders at the 2018 Winter Olympics
Croatian male bobsledders
Olympic bobsledders of Croatia